The 2004–05 Barangay Ginebra Kings season was the 26th season of the franchise in the Philippine Basketball Association (PBA).

Transactions

Occurrences
Coach Allan Caidic was promoted as team manager and was replaced by assistant coach Bethune Tanquingcen after five games into the 2004 Fiesta Conference.

Championships
The Barangay Ginebra Kings won the PBA's transition tournament called Fiesta Conference over Red Bull Barako, 3 games to 1, in the best-of-five title series for their first championship after seven long years, as the team celebrates its fifth overall title on July 7, 2004, defeating Red Bull, 103-86 in Game 4. 

As the PBA entered its 30th season with the regular two-conference format, the Barangay Ginebra Kings repeated as champions, the first time in its franchise history, by winning the 2004–2005 Grand Matador Philippine Cup title over the Talk 'N Text Phone Pals, 4 games to 2.

Awards
Eric Menk became the first Ginebra player to win the Most Valuable Player (MVP) honors for the season. Menk also won the finals MVP and Best Player of the Conference Award.

Roster

Philippine Cup

Game log

|- bgcolor="#edbebf"
| 1
| October 6
| Purefoods
| 87–104
| Caguioa (20)
| 
| 
| Araneta Coliseum
| 0–1
|- bgcolor="#bbffbb"
| 2
| October 10
| Sta.Lucia
| 88-84
| Helterbrand (23)
| Menk (16)
| 
| Araneta Coliseum
| 1–1
|- bgcolor="#edbebf"
| 3
| October 13
| San Miguel
| 72–83
| Adducul (15)
| 
| 
| Araneta Coliseum
| 1–2
|- bgcolor="#bbffbb"
| 4
| October 21
| FedEx
| 126-121
| Caguioa (39)
| 
| 
| Dipolog
| 2–2 
|- bgcolor="#edbebf"
| 5
| October 24
| Shell
| 81–86
| Helterbrand (24) 
| 
| 
| Araneta Coliseum
| 2–3
|- bgcolor="#bbffbb"
| 6
| October 27
| Talk 'N Text
| 91-80
| Menk (22)
| 
| 
| Araneta Coliseum
| 3–3

|-bgcolor="#bbffbb"
| 14
| December 9
| Shell
| 
| 
| 
| 
| Urdaneta City
| 10–4
|-bgcolor="#edbebf"
| 15
| December 12
| Alaska
| 88–102
| Menk (24)
| 
| 
| Araneta Coliseum
| 10–5
|-bgcolor="#bbffbb"
| 16
| December 17
| Red Bull
| 107-89
| Menk (26)
| 
| 
| Ynares Center
| 11–5
|-bgcolor="#bbffbb"
| 17
| December 21
| San Miguel
| 
| 
| 
| 
| Laoag City
| 12–5
|-bgcolor="#bbffbb"
| 18
| December 25
| Talk 'N Text
| 108-102
| Helterbrand (33)
| 
| 
| Cuneta Astrodome
| 13–5

Recruited imports

GP – Games played

References

Barangay Ginebra San Miguel seasons
Barangay